Wapping is a district in East London in the London Borough of Tower Hamlets. Wapping's position, on the north bank of the River Thames, has given it a strong maritime character, which it retains through its riverside public houses and steps, such as the Prospect of Whitby and Wapping Stairs. It also has a Royal Navy shore establishment base on the riverfront called HMS President and home to Tobacco Dock and King Edward Memorial Park.

Many of the original buildings were demolished during the construction of the London Docks and Wapping was further seriously damaged during the Blitz. As the London Docklands declined after the Second World War, the area became run down, with the great warehouses left empty. The area's fortunes were transformed during the 1980s by the London Docklands Development Corporation when the warehouses started to be converted into luxury flats.

Rupert Murdoch moved his News International printing and publishing works into Wapping in 1986, resulting in a trade union dispute that became known as the "Battle of Wapping".

History

Origins

Formerly it was believed that the name Wapping recorded an Anglo-Saxon settlement linked to a personal name Waeppa ("the settlement of Waeppa's people"). More recent scholarship discounts that theory: much of the area was marshland, where early settlement was unlikely, and no such personal name has ever been found.  It is now thought that the name may derive from wapol, a marsh.

Wapping was historically part of the Manor and Parish of Stepney. By the 17th century it formed two autonomous Hamlets, a Hamlet in this context refers to an autonomous area of a parish rather than a small village. The northern Hamlet was known as Wapping-Stepney, as it was the part of Wapping within Stepney, the riverside part was known as Wapping-Whitechapel as it was the part within the parish of Whitechapel, a parish which was previously also a part of the parish of Stepney.

These Hamlets later became independent parishes, with Wapping-Stepney becoming known as St-George-in-the-East (in 1729) and Wapping-Whitechapel known as St John of Wapping (in 1694). The latter occupied a very narrow strip along nearly all of Wapping's riverside.

Riverside development

The draining of Wapping Marsh, and the consolidation of a river wall along which houses were built, were finally achieved by 1600 after previous attempts had failed. (See Embanking of the tidal Thames). The settlement developed along that river wall, hemmed in by the river to the south and the now-drained Wapping Marsh to the north This gave it a peculiarly narrow and constricted shape, consisting of little more than the axis of Wapping High Street and some north–south side streets. John Stow, the 16th-century historian, described it as a "continual street, or a filthy strait passage, with alleys of small tenements or cottages, built, inhabited by sailors' victuallers". A chapel to St. John the Baptist was built in 1617, and it was here that Thomas Rainsborough was buried. Wapping was constituted as a parish in 1694.

Wapping's proximity to the river gave it a strong maritime character for centuries, well into the 20th century. It was inhabited by sailors, mastmakers, boat-builders, blockmakers, instrument-makers, victuallers and representatives of all the other trades that supported the seafarer. Wapping was also the site of 'Execution Dock', where pirates and other water-borne criminals faced execution by hanging from a gibbet constructed close to the low water mark. Their bodies would be left dangling until they had been submerged three times by the tide.

The Bell Inn, by the execution dock, was run by Samuel Batts, whose daughter, Elizabeth, married James Cook at St Margaret's Church, Barking, Essex on 21 December 1762, after the Royal Navy captain had stayed at the Inn. The couple initially settled in Shadwell, attending St Paul's church, but later moved to Mile End. Although they had six children together, much of their married life was spent apart, with Cook absent on his voyages and, after his murder in 1779 at Kealakekua Bay, she survived until 1835.

Said to be England's first, the Marine Police Force was formed in 1798 by magistrate Patrick Colquhoun and a Master Mariner, John Harriott, to tackle theft and looting from ships anchored in the Pool of London and the lower reaches of the river. Its base was (and remains) in Wapping High Street and it is now known as the Marine Support Unit. The Thames Police Museum, dedicated to the history of the Marine Police Force, is currently housed within the headquarters of the Marine Support Unit, and is open to the public by appointment.

In 1811, the Ratcliff Highway murders took place nearby at The Highway and Wapping Lane.

London Docks
The area's strong maritime associations changed radically in the 19th century when the London Docks were built to the north and west of the High Street. Wapping's population plummeted by nearly 60% during that century, with many houses destroyed by the construction of the docks and giant warehouses along the riverfront. Squeezed between the high walls of the docks and warehouses, the riverside area became isolated from the rest of London, although some relief was provided by Brunel's Thames Tunnel to Rotherhithe. The opening of  Wapping tube station on the East London Line in 1869 provided a direct rail link to the rest of London.

Modern times

Wapping was devastated by German bombing in the Second World War and by the post-war closure of the docks. It remained a run-down and derelict area into the 1980s, when the area was transferred to the management of the London Docklands Development Corporation, a government quango with the task of redeveloping the Docklands. The London Docks were largely filled in and redeveloped with a variety of commercial, light industrial and residential properties.

St John's Church, Wapping (1756) was located on what is now Scandrett Street. Only the tower and shell survived wartime bombing, and have now been converted to housing.

In 1986, Rupert Murdoch's News International built a new £80m printing and publishing works in the north of Wapping. This became the scene of violent protests after News International's UK operation moved from Fleet Street to Wapping, with over 5,000 print workers being sacked when new technology was introduced.

Wapping dispute

The "Wapping dispute" or "Battle of Wapping" was, along with the miners' strike of 1984–85, a significant turning point in the history of the trade union movement and of UK industrial relations. It started on 24 January 1986 when some 6,000 newspaper workers went on strike after protracted negotiation with their employer, News International (parent of Times Newspapers and News Group Newspapers, and chaired by Rupert Murdoch). News International had built and clandestinely equipped a new printing plant for all its titles in Wapping, and when the print unions announced a strike it activated this new plant with the assistance of the Electrical, Electronic, Telecommunications and Plumbing Union (EETPU).

The plant was nicknamed "Fortress Wapping" when the sacked print workers effectively besieged it, mounting round-the-clock pickets and blockades in an ultimately unsuccessful attempt to thwart the move. In 2005, News International announced the intention to move the print works to regional presses based in Broxbourne (the world's largest printing plant, opened March 2008), Liverpool and Glasgow. The editorial staff were to remain, however, and there was talk of redeveloping the sizeable plot that makes up the printing works.

Society

Landmarks

Perhaps Wapping's greatest attraction is the Thames foreshore itself, and the venerable public houses that face onto it. A number of the 'watermen's stairs', such as Wapping Old Stairs and Pelican Stairs (by the Prospect of Whitby) give public access to a littoral zone (for the Thames is tidal at this point) littered with flotsam, jetsam and fragments of old dock installations. The area is popular with amateur archaeologists and treasure hunters. This activity is known as mudlarking; the term for a shore scavenger in the 18th and 19th centuries was a mudlark.

St George in the East on Cannon Street Road is one of six Hawksmoor churches in London, built from 1714 to 1729, with funding from the Commission for Building Fifty New Churches. The church was hit by a bomb during the Blitz the original interior was destroyed by the fire, but the walls and distinctive "pepper-pot" towers remained intact.  In 1964 a modern church interior was constructed inside the existing walls for the active congregation, and a new flat built under each corner tower. Behind the church lies St George's Gardens, the original cemetery, which was passed to Stepney Council to maintain as a public park in mid-Victorian times. At the outbreak of the Second World War the crypt of the church was used as a public air raid shelter and was fully occupied when the aforementioned bomb struck. There were no casualties and everyone was evacuated safely (thanks to the air raid wardens and fire brigade).

St John's Church, Wapping, the oldest church in Wapping, built in 1756 by Joel Johnson, was also hit by a bomb during WWII. The distinctive lead-topped tower remains, and the former churchyard is a public park. Adjoining the church is St John's Old School, founded c. 1695 for the new parish and rebuilt together with the church in 1756.The "Execution Dock" was located on the Thames. It was used by the Admiralty for over 400 years (as late as 1830) to hang pirates that had been convicted and sentenced to death by the Admiralty court. The Admiralty only had jurisdiction over crimes on the sea, so the dock was located within their jurisdiction by being located far enough offshore as to be beyond the low-tide mark. It was used to kill the notorious Captain Kidd.  Many prisoners would be executed together as a public event in front of a crowd of onlookers after being paraded from the Marshalsea Prison across London Bridge and past the Tower of London to the dock.

Tobacco Dock is a Grade I listed warehouse, adjacent to The Highway. It was constructed in approximately 1811 and served primarily as a store for imported tobacco. In 1990 it was converted into a shopping centre at a development cost of £47 million with the intention to create the "Covent Garden of the East End"; the scheme was unsuccessful, though, and went into administration. Since the mid-1990s the building has been almost entirely unoccupied. It is now occasionally used for filming, and for large corporate and commercial events.

Three venerable public houses are located near the Stairs. By Pelican Stairs is the Prospect of Whitby, formerly the Devil's Tavern, which has a much-disputed claim to be the oldest Thames-side public house still in existence. Be that as it may, there has been an inn on the site since the reign of Henry VIII, and it is certainly one of the most famous public houses in London. It is named after a then-famous collier that used to dock regularly at Wapping. A replica of the old Execution Dock gibbet is maintained on the adjacent foreshore, although the actual site of Execution Dock was nearer to the Town of Ramsgate. This also is on the site of a 16th-century inn and is located next to Wapping Old Stairs to the west of the Prospect; by Wapping Pier Head — the former local headquarters of the Customs and Excise.

Situated halfway between the two is the Captain Kidd, named after the Scottish privateer William Kidd. He was hanged on the Wapping foreshore in 1701 after being found guilty of murder and piracy. Although the pub occupies a 17th-century building, it was established only in the 1980s.

Literary and cultural references
Wapping has been used as the setting for a number of works of fiction, including The Long Good Friday; the Doctor Who episode "The Talons of Weng-Chiang"; the Ruby In The Smoke novel in the Sally Lockhart series by Phillip Pullman; the BBC sitcom Till Death Us Do Part, in which the central character, Alf Garnett, shares his name with Garnet Street in Wapping; season 4, episode 23 of Friends, "The One with Ross's Wedding", which features St John's Church, Wapping; and the brothel in The Threepenny Opera, in which Mack the Knife is betrayed by Jenny Diver. The Darlings of Wapping Wharf Launderette is a compilation album by East End group the Small Faces.
The plot of Alfred Hitchcock's 1934 film The Man Who Knew Too Much included the gangsters' hideout which was set in Wapping.  A house left standing after the London Blitz, the nearby River Thames and a notional priory house, being used as a temporary prison, feature prominently in Jack Higgins sequel to The Eagle Has Landed titled The Eagle Has Flown, in which a captured German officer is freed after a failed commando raid.

Notable people
People who were born in Wapping include:

 W.W. Jacobs, author of the 1902 short story The Monkey's Paw
 John Newton, Anglican clergyman and author of many hymns including Amazing Grace
 Walter Kennedy, a notorious early 18th century pirate
 Arthur Orton, a Tichborne Claimant
 Les Reed, football coach and former manager of Charlton Athletic

People who lived in Wapping:

 The American painter James McNeill Whistler, well known for his Thames views, painted Wapping (1860–1864) after returning to London from Paris in May 1859. Whistler took lodgings in Wapping where he explored the Thames to the east of the City of London. The painting is permanently displayed at the National Gallery of Art Washington.

 During the 1990s, Wapping was home to American singer and actress Cher.
 TV presenter Graham Norton.
 Actress Helen Mirren lives in Wapping.

Education

Transport
RailThe local station is Wapping on the London Overground East London line. The narrowness of the platforms was also a concern during the East London line extension, and today the station does not fully meet the safety standards for an underground station but is permitted to operate under a derogation from Her Majesty's Railway Inspectorate.
It is in Travelcard Zone 2.

Formerly on the London Underground, the Metropolitan and the District Railways were the first served the station on 1 October 1884, but the station was last served by District trains on 31 July 1905. The East London line closed on 22 December 2007, and was rebranded and reopened on 27 April 2010 when it became part of the Overground system.

Buses
100, D3, both operate within the area.

Roads
Wapping is connected to the National Road Network by The Highway A1203 east–west to the north of the area.

Cycling, walking, waterways
The Thames Path passes west–east through Wapping for cyclists and walkers. The Ornamental Canal runs through the area mostly in the centre to Shadwell Basin.

In popular culture

 The 1967 film To Sir, with Love was shot in Wapping.

See also
 Stepney Historical Trust
 Tobacco Dock
 Wapping Hockey Club
 Wapping Hydraulic Power Station

References

Bibliography
Madge Darby, Waeppa's People: History of Wapping, Connor & Butler (Dec 1988), 
Martha Leigh, Memories of Wapping 1900–1960: Couldn't Afford the Eels, The History Press Ltd (4 July 2008), 
National Council for Civil Liberties, No Way in Wapping: Effect of the Policing of the News International Dispute on Wapping Residents, Civil Liberties Trust (May 1986),

External links

Local government site
ExploringEastLondon - Wapping
Thames Police Museum website
What's in Wapping - Local community website

 
Areas of London
Districts of London on the River Thames
Districts of the London Borough of Tower Hamlets
Port of London